The 31st American Society of Cinematographers Awards were held on February 4, 2017, at the Hollywood & Highland Ray Dolby Ballroom, honoring the best cinematographers of film and television in 2016.

The television nominees were announced on December 6, 2016, while the film nominees were announced on January 11, 2017. The usual "Regular Series" category was separated into two categories this year—"Regular Series for Non-Commercial Television" and "Regular Series for Commercial Television".

Winners and nominees

Board of Directors Award
 Awarded to director and actor Denzel Washington.

Film

Outstanding Achievement in Cinematography in Theatrical Release
 Greig Fraser, ASC, ACS – Lion
 James Laxton – Moonlight
 Rodrigo Prieto, ASC, AMC – Silence
 Linus Sandgren, FSF – La La Land
 Bradford Young, ASC – Arrival

Spotlight Award
The Spotlight Award recognizes outstanding cinematography in features and documentaries that are typically screened at film festivals, in limited theatrical release, or outside the United States.

 Gorka Gómez Andreu, AEC – House of Others
 Lol Crawley, BSC – The Childhood of a Leader
 Ernesto Pardo – Tempestad
 Juliette van Dormael – My Angel

Television

Outstanding Achievement in Cinematography in Regular Series for Non-Commercial Television
 Fabian Wagner, BSC – Game of Thrones (Episode: "Battle of the Bastards") (HBO)
 John Conroy – Penny Dreadful (Episode: "The Day Tennyson Died") (Showtime)
 David Dunlap – House of Cards (Episode: "Chapter 45") (Netflix)
 Anette Haellmigk – Game of Thrones (Episode: "Book of the Stranger") (HBO)
 Neville Kidd – Outlander (Episode: "Prestonpans") (Starz)

Outstanding Achievement in Cinematography in Regular Series for Commercial Television
 Tod Campbell – Mr. Robot (Episode: "eps2.0_unm4sk-pt1.tc") (USA)
 John Grillo – Preacher (Episode: "Finish the Song") (AMC)
 Kevin McKnight – Underground (Episode: "The Macon 7") (WGN)
 Christopher Norr – Gotham (Episode: "Wrath of the Villains: Mr. Freeze") (Fox)
 Richard Rutkowski – Manhattan (Episode: "Jupiter") (WGN)

Outstanding Achievement in Cinematography in Television Movie, Miniseries, or Pilot
 Igor Martinovic – The Night Of (Episode: "Subtle Beast") (HBO)
 Balazs Bolygo, HSC, BSC – Harley and the Davidsons (Episode: "Amazing Machine") (Discovery)
 Paul Cameron, ASC – Westworld (Episode: "The Original") (HBO)
 Jim Denault, ASC – All the Way (HBO)
 Alex Disenhof – The Exorcist (Episode: "Chapter One: And Let My Cry Come Unto Thee") (Fox)

Other awards
 Lifetime Achievement Award: Edward Lachman, ASC
 Career Achievement in Television: Ron García, ASC
 International Award: Philippe Rousselot, ASC, AFC
 Presidents Award: Nancy Schreiber, ASC

References

2016
2016 film awards
2016 television awards
American
2016 in American cinema